Truth is a compilation album by Australian music group Southern Sons. The album was released only in Europe and Canada by RCA Records in November 1993 on CD and audio cassette. The album contains an assortment of tracks taken from their first two studio albums, Southern Sons and Nothing But The Truth, it was produced by Ross Fraser and Louis Shelton

Track listing
 "Always and Ever" (P. Buckle) – 3:58
 "Lead Me to Water" (P. Buckle) – 4:32
 "Sometimes" (P. Bowman, P. Buckle) – 3:54
 "Heart in Danger" (P. Buckle) – 4:58
 "You Were There" (P. Buckle) – 3:58
 "Shelter" (J. Jones, P. Buckle) – 5:18
 "Still Love You So" (P. Buckle) – 4:45
 "Hold Me in Your Arms" (P. Buckle) – 4:05
 "Can't Wait Any Longer" (J. Jones, P. Buckle) – 4:24
 "Nothing But The Truth" (P. Buckle) – 5:11
 "What I See" (P. Bowman, P. Buckle) – 3:33

Personnel
Jack Jones – lead vocals, guitars
Phil Buckle – guitars, backing vocals
Virgil Donati – drums, keyboards
Geoff Cain – bass
 Peter Bowman – guitars, backing vocals
David Hirschfelder – string arrangements and keyboards on "Always And Ever" and "You Were There"
Geoff Hales – additional percussion

References

Southern Sons albums
1993 albums
Compilation albums by Australian artists